The women's discus throw event was part of the track and field athletics programme at the 1936 Summer Olympics. The competition was held on August 4, 1936.  The final was won by Gisela Mauermayer of Germany.

Results

Final standings

Key: OR = Olympic record

References

Athletics at the 1936 Summer Olympics
Discus throw at the Olympics
1936 in women's athletics
Ath